Charetti Maria America-Francisca (born 13 April 1981) is a politician from Curaçao. She has been the president of Parliament of Curaçao since 11 May 2021. Charetti also served as member of the Estates of Curaçao from 2016 to 2017.

Charetti was born and raised in a poor neighborhood in Curaçao, Pretu by De Savaan. After secondary school she attended the Maria Immaculata Lyceum, and studied business at the Academy for Business Management. She initially worked in the banking sector but later on switched into family coaching. Charetti was in her daily labours confronted with the need especially under the youth and started an orphanage, called My Fathers House. She is also the founder of Curaçao Charity Foundation and co-founder of Curaçao Youth Care Foundation. She married Andy America on 30 June 2000, and together they have five children. They travel the world organizing couples conferences and overseeing different Christian communities.

Charetti made her entrance in politics during the parliamentary elections of 2016. Shortly after the elections of 2021 she became a member of parliament and was unanimously elected president.

References

1978 births
Members of the Estates of Curaçao
Movement for the Future of Curaçao politicians
Presidents of the Estates of Curaçao
Dutch politicians
Living people
Curaçao women in politics
21st-century Dutch women politicians
21st-century Dutch politicians
Women legislative speakers